James H. Diehl (born 1937) is a minister and general superintendent emeritus in the Church of the Nazarene.  He was elected in 1993.

External links 
 Biography on the Church of the Nazarene website
 This One and Only Journey
 Diehl Receives Citation of Emeritus Status

1937 births
Living people
Nazarene General Superintendents
American Nazarene ministers
Olivet Nazarene University alumni